The Korean Connection is 1974 Korean martial art movie starring Han Yong Cheol (Credited as Billy Chan) and Kwan Young Moon.

Plot
In 1930 in China the Korean professional kicker Tiger (Park Young Cheol) fell in love with  Hyang Souk however at the same time he made an agreement with Yamamoto (As a suggestion from the Wang Herim) to steal the carriage with full of gold and Tiger steal it. After Tiger realized that the carriage was belongs to Hyang Souk's brother he felt himself guilty, break himself his leg and spent his time with alcoholic. Meanwhile, Yamamoto killed Herim, kidnapped Hyang Souk and take over the territory Tiger is now in rage and alongside Korean independent army Kim Sung, he defeat the Yamamoto save Hyang Souk, take the gold and went back to Korea.

Cast
Charles Han Yong Cheol as Tiger
Kwan Young Moon as Kim Sung
Bae Su Cheon as Yamamoto
Jeong Ae-Jeong as Hyang Souk
Kim Moon Ju
Hwang Jang-lee as Kazio (uncredited)
Mang Hoi as beggar kid (cameo, uncredited)
Bae Su Cheol
Kim Wang Kuk
Park Dong Yong
Chiu Chun
Kim Young In
Choe Jae Ho
Hwang In Cheol
Nam Seoung Guk
Han Myeong Hwan
Kwon Il Soo
Elton Chong extra (uncredited)
Huang Hwa extra (uncredited)
Kim Young Suk extra (uncredited)
Phillip Leung extra (uncredited)
Lee Hing Yue extra (uncredited)
Han Tae Il extra (uncredited)

Media release
The film was released by company Hong Kong Connection under the name Deadly fist in Korea and for VHS tape it was released as He Who Returned with One Leg.

Sequel
The film later receive the sequel as Returned Single-Legged Man 2 which was only released in Korea and outside Europe released as Korean Connection 2 the sequel was not released in U.S.

External links

1974 films
South Korean action films
Films directed by Lee Doo-yong
1970s Korean-language films